The mountain thrush (Turdus plebejus) is a large thrush which is found in Central America. It was formerly known as the mountain robin. Some authorities refer to it as the American mountain thrush to differentiate it from the Abyssinian thrush (Turdus abyssinicus), known in their taxonomy as the African mountain thrush.

Description
The mountain thrush resembles other Turdus thrushes in general appearance and habits. The adult is uniformly dull olive-brown with faint white streaks on the throat. The bill is black and the legs are dark brown. The juvenile resembles the adult, but has buff or orange streaks on the head and upperparts, and dark spotting on the underparts. Two superficially similar relatives share this species range: the sooty thrush is blacker with an orange bill, eye ring and legs, and the clay-colored thrush is much paler and yellow-billed.

There are three poorly defined subspecies:
 T. p. plebejus — Cabanis, 1861 — nominate, found in the mountains of Costa Rica and western Panama, described above
 T. p. differens — (Nelson, 1901) — found from the Pacific slope of Mexico to Caribbean Guatemala is more olive above, and more olive brown and less grey below
 T. p. rafaelensis — Miller, W & Griscom, 1925 — found in the highlands from Honduras to northwestern Nicaragua is intermediate between the northern and southern subspecies above, and is often merged with differens

Distribution and habitat
This is a bird of tall mountain forests and adjacent more open areas and woodland edge which breeds in highlands from southern Mexico to western Panama. Its preference is for oak with many epiphytes and mosses, normally from  altitude to the timberline.

Behaviour
The mountain thrush behaves like other thrushes. It forages on large branches or on the ground, in flocks when not breeding, progressing in hops and dashes with frequent stops. It turns leaf litter seeking small fruits, insects and spiders.

Breeding
The female lays 2–3 unmarked greenish-blue eggs between March and June. The breeding season song is an unthrushlike mechanical monotone chip chip cher chip chip cher cher, and the call is a high seee or whip.

References

External links

 
 
 
 

mountain thrush
mountain thrush
Birds of Mexico
Birds of Guatemala
Birds of Honduras
Birds of Costa Rica
mountain thrush